The Seattle Mariners  season was their eighth since the franchise creation.

Offseason 
 November 21, 1983: Bill Caudill and Darrel Akerfelds were traded to the Oakland Athletics for Dave Beard and Bob Kearney.
 December 5, 1983: Dave Geisel was selected by the Mariners from the Toronto Blue Jays in the rule 5 draft.
 January 17, 1984: Mike Blowers was selected in the eighth round of the amateur draft, but did not sign.
 March 23, 1984: Rick Sweet was released by the Mariners.

Regular season 
September 1 – Manager Del Crandall was fired on Saturday morning, August 31, succeeded by third base coach Chuck Cottier.
First baseman Alvin Davis reached base in each of the first 47 games of his career, and was chosen for his only All-Star Game. The M's MVP, he was also voted the American League's Rookie of the Year, with a .284 batting average, 27 home runs, and 116 RBIs.
Lefthanded starting pitcher Mark Langston became the first rookie since Herb Score to lead the American League in strikeouts; he was second in the balloting to teammate Davis for AL Rookie of the Year

Season standings

Record vs. opponents

Notable transactions

Roster

Game log

Regular season

|-

|-style=background:#fbb
| 36 || May 14 || || @ Tigers || 5–7 || Lopez || Vande Berg || – || 3:05 || 18,830 || 18–18 || L2
|-style=background:#fbb
| 37 || May 15 || || @ Tigers || 4–6 || Morris || Thomas || Hernandez || 3:32 || 21,782 || 18–19 || L3
|-style=background:#fbb
| 38 || May 16 || || @ Tigers || 1–10 || Wilcox || Young || – || 2:52 || 22,001 || 18–20 || L4
|-style=background:#cfc
| 45 || May 25 || || Tigers || 7–3 || Vande Berg || Wilcox || Mirabella || 2:54 || 15,722 || 21–24 || W1
|-style=background:#cfc
| 46 || May 26 || || Tigers || 9–5 || Moore || Berenguer || – || 2:51 || 41,342 || 22–24 || W2
|-style=background:#cfc
| 47 || May 27 || || Tigers || 6–1 || Young || Petry || – || 2:50 || 12,755 || 23–24 || W3
|-

|-

|-style=background:#bbbfff
|colspan="12"|55th All-Star Game in San Francisco, CA
|-

|-style=background:#fbb
| 123 || August 17 || || @ Tigers || 2–6 || Wilcox || Moore || – || 3:08 || 36,496 || 55–68 || L1
|-style=background:#fbb
| 124 || August 18 || || @ Tigers || 3–4 || Berenguer || Geisel || Hernandez || 2:41 || 36,719 || 55–69 || L2
|-style=background:#cfc
| 125 || August 19 || || @ Tigers || 4–1 || Langston || Petry || Vande Berg || 2:51 || 43,277 || 56–69 || W1
|-style=background:#fbb
| 132 || August 28 || || Tigers || 4–5 || Hernandez || Stanton || – || 2:51 || 8,353 || 57–75 || L5
|-style=background:#cfc
| 133 || August 29 || || Tigers || 5–1 || Langston || Petry || – || 2:11 || 10,863 || 58–75 || W1
|-style=background:#cfc
| 134 || August 30 || || Tigers || 2–1 || Beattie || Morris || Nunez || 2:34 || 9,583 || 59–75 || W2
|-

|-

|- style="text-align:center;"
| Legend:       = Win       = Loss       = PostponementBold = Mariners team member

Player stats

Batting

Starters by position 
Note: Pos = Position; G = Games played; AB = At bats; H = Hits; Avg. = Batting average; HR = Home runs; RBI = Runs batted in

Other batters 
Note: G = Games played; AB = At bats; H = Hits; Avg. = Batting average; HR = Home runs; RBI = Runs batted in

Pitching

Starting pitchers 
Note: G = Games pitched; IP = Innings pitched; W = Wins; L = Losses; ERA = Earned run average; SO = Strikeouts

Other pitchers 
Note: G = Games pitched; IP = Innings pitched; W = Wins; L = Losses; ERA = Earned run average; SO = Strikeouts

Relief pitchers 
Note: G = Games pitched; W = Wins; L = Losses; SV = Saves; ERA = Earned run average; SO = Strikeouts

Awards and honors 
 Mark Langston – American League Leader, Strikeouts (204)

All-Star Game

Farm system

References

External links
1984 Seattle Mariners at Baseball Reference
1984 Seattle Mariners team page at www.baseball-almanac.com

Seattle Mariners seasons
Seattle Mariners season
Seattle Mariners